Lavender and Old Lace is a 1921 American silent drama film directed by Lloyd Ingraham and starring Marguerite Snow, Seena Owen, Louis Bennison, Victor Potel, and Zella Ingraham. It is based on the 1902 novel of the same name by Myrtle Reed. The film was released by W. W. Hodkinson  in June 1921.

Cast
Marguerite Snow as Mary Ainslie
Seena Owen as Ruth Thorne
Louis Bennison as Captain Charles Winfield / Carl Winfield
Victor Potel as Joe Pendleton
Zella Ingraham as Hepsey
Lillian Elliott as Jane Hathaway
James Corrigan as Jimmy Ball

Preservation
The film is now considered lost.

References

External links

1921 drama films
Silent American drama films
1921 films
American silent feature films
American black-and-white films
Films distributed by W. W. Hodkinson Corporation
Lost American films
Films based on American novels
Films directed by Lloyd Ingraham
1921 lost films
Lost drama films
1920s American films